Shape of Things to Come may refer to:

Literature
 The Shape of Things to Come, a 1933 science fiction novel by H G Wells
 The Shape of Things to Come: Prophecy and the American Voice, a collection of essays by American historian and culture critic Greil Marcus

Film and television
 H. G. Wells' The Shape of Things to Come, a 1979 Canadian film loosely based on the Wells novel
 "The Shape of Things to Come" (film), a 2021 internationally co-produced science fiction drama film directed by Victor Manuel Checa
 "The Shape of Things to Come" (Lost), a 2008 episode of Lost
 "The Shape of Things to Come" (The O.C.), a 2005 episode of teen drama television series The O.C.

Music
 Shape of Things to Come (Max Frost and the Troopers album), 1968
 Shape of Things to Come (George Benson album), 1969
 The Shape of Things to Come... (EP), a 2003 EP by My Ruin
 "Shape of Things to Come" (song), a 1968 song written by Barry Mann and Cynthia Weil
 "Shape of Things to Come" (Audioslave song)
 "The Shape of Things to Come", a 1979 song by The Headboys
 "The Shape of Things to Come", a composition by Bear McCreary for Battlestar Galactica

See also
 "Shapes of Things", a 1966 rock song by the Yardbirds
 The Shape of Jazz to Come, a 1959 album by saxophonist Ornette Coleman
 The Shape of Punk to Come, a 1997 album by Swedish band Refused
 Things to Come (disambiguation)